The National Eligibility cum Entrance Test (Undergraduate) or NEET (UG), formerly the All India Pre-Medical Test (AIPMT), is an all India pre-medical entrance test for students who wish to pursue undergraduate medical (MBBS), dental (BDS) and AYUSH (BAMS, BUMS, BHMS, etc.) courses in government and private institutions in India and also, for those intending to pursue primary medical qualification abroad.

The exam is conducted by National Testing Agency (NTA), which provides the results to the Directorate General of Health Services under Ministry of Health and Family Welfare and State Counselling Authorities for seat allocation.

NEET-UG replaced the All India Pre Medical Test (AIPMT) and many other pre-medical exams conducted by states and various medical colleges. However, due to lawsuits being filed against the exam, it could not be held in 2014 and 2015.

NEET-UG is a single entrance test for admissions to MBBS and BDS colleges across India. NEET UG is one of the largest exam in India in terms of registered applicants.

After the enactment of NMC Act 2019 in September 2019, NEET-UG became the sole entrance test for admissions to medical colleges in India including the All India Institutes of Medical Sciences (AIIMS) and Jawaharlal Institute of Postgraduate Medical Education & Research (JIPMER) which until then conducted separate exams.

History
Before NEET (UG) was implemented nationwide, states conducted their own entrance tests and some prestigious medical colleges like AIIMS, JIPMER, IMS-BHU, KMC Manipal & Mangalore and CMC Vellore conducted their own entrance exams.

NEET was initially proposed to take place from 2012 onwards. However, for several reasons, the CBSE and Medical Council of India deferred NEET by a year. The test was announced by the Government of India and was held for the first time on 5 May 2013 across India for students seeking admission for both undergraduate and postgraduate medicine. On 18 July 2013, the Supreme Court ruled in favor of 115 petitions and cancelled the NEET exam and announced that the MCI could not interfere with the admission process done by colleges.

Following the announcement from the Medical Council of India that it would introduce the NEET-UG exam in 2012, several states including Andhra Pradesh, Karnataka, Gujarat, West Bengal and Tamil Nadu strongly opposed the change, stating that there was a huge variation in the syllabus proposed by the MCI and their state syllabi. Even though NEET 2016 is conducted in English and Hindi, it was announced that students can write exams in Tamil, Telugu, Marathi, Bengali, Assamese and Gujarati languages from 2017 onwards. Kannada and Odia languages are added to the list so that students can write the exams in nine Indian languages and English.
The Supreme Court of India quashed the National Eligibility cum Entrance Test (NEET) for admissions into all medical and dental colleges on 18 July 2013. The apex court ruled that the Medical Council of India cannot conduct a unified examination.

According to a 2013 announcement by CBSE, CBSE planned to conduct AIPMT on 4 May 2014. The final decision on NEET UG was planned to be taken after the verdict of the Supreme Court of India.

The Central Board of Secondary Education announces the results and the All India Merit List for NEET-UG. The merit list and the waiting list are prepared as per the directives of the Supreme Court of India, DGHS, MCI and DCI. The results for 2013 were announced on 5 June.

NEET was declared illegal and unconstitutional by the Supreme Court of India in 2013. However, it was restored on 11 April 2016, after a five-judge Constitution bench recalled the earlier verdict and allowed the Central Government and the Medical Council of India (MCI) to implement the common entrance test until the court decides afresh on its validity.

Phase One Test (2016)
The All India Pre Medical Test, also known as AIPMT,  held on 1 May 2016, was considered as the first phase of the NEET. Students who registered for Phase One were given a chance to appear for the next phase of NEET held on 24 July 2016, but with a condition that candidates have to give up their NEET Phase 1 score. The above dates are as per the order of the Supreme Court.

Exam pattern and structure 
There are a total of 180 questions asked in the exam, 45 questions each from Physics, Chemistry, Botany and Zoology. Each correct response fetches 4 marks and each incorrect response gets -1 negative marking. The exam duration is 3 hours 20 minutes (200 min). The exam is of 720 marks (maximum marks).

Since 2021, there has been a significant alteration in the format of the question paper. The latest structure includes two sections, i.e. A and B, in all four subjects, namely Physics, Chemistry, Botany, and Zoology. Section A comprises 35 mandatory questions, while Section B contains 15 questions, out of which 10 questions are to be answered, leading to a total of 200 questions, with 180 questions that can be answered.

Syllabus
NEET (UG) syllabus consists of the core concepts of Physics, Chemistry and Biology taught in classes 11 and 12 as prescribed by the NCERT.

Organizing body 
The National Testing Agency (NTA) has been made the nodal agency for conduct of all India competitive exams and conducts NEET (UG) from 2019. The Central Board of Secondary Education conducted NEET between 2013 and 2018 before the setting of NTA.

Opposition 
The introduction of NEET has received opposition from some entities, most notably the state of Tamil Nadu. The bulk of the major political parties represented in the state, including the AIADMK and the ruling DMK have expressed resistance to the test on multiple grounds.

Number of applicants by year 

* Postponed and delayed in 2020/21/22 because of the COVID-19 pandemic.

Exam cutoff

Colleges 
As per the orders of the Supreme Court and the NMC Act 2019, a single medical entrance exam is conducted all over India for admission into medical and dental colleges, colleges and universities will not be able to conduct their own medical entrance exam and will accept students based on the All India Rank obtained in NEET (UG). After the declaration of the results, an All India Rank (AIR) is allotted to each candidate and a merit list is released. The National Medical Commission conducts counselling (allotment of seats according to merit and candidate choice) for 15% state seats, central institutes and deemed universities. The counselling for remaining 85% state quota seats and private colleges is done by the medical boards of respective states. States prepare their separate merit list on basis of NEET-UG results. The total number of seats offered under NEET as of 2022 are 177,126 (98,013 for MBBS, 27,868 for BDS, 50,720 for AYUSH and 525 for BVSc).

See also

Capitation fee
Compulsory Rotating Medical Internship
Educational Commission for Foreign Medical Graduates
JEE – Main
Junior Science Talent Search Examination
Medical Council of India
Medical Council of India Screening Test
Suicide of S. Anitha
The National Council for Human Resource in Health in India

References 

Medical education in India
Standardised tests in India
2013 establishments in India